2-Headed Shark Attack is an American low-budget survival horror film with an ensemble cast by The Asylum, released on January 31, 2012 in the United States. Directed by Christopher Ray, the film stars Carmen Electra, Charlie O'Connell, Brooke Hogan, Christina Bach, David Gallegos and Corinne Nobili. The film premiered on September 8, 2012 on Syfy.

Plot
The film opens with a group of wakeboarders being attacked and devoured by a two-headed great white shark. Meanwhile, Sea King, a Semester at Sea ship led by Professor Franklin Babish and his wife, Anne, hits a dead shark, which becomes lodged in the boat's propeller, damaging the ship's hull and causing the boat to take on water. Soon after, the two-headed shark attacks the boat and breaks the radio antenna, preventing ship co-captain Laura from summoning help. Professor Babish and the students use a dinghy to take shelter on a nearby deserted atoll, while Anne remains on the Sea King with Laura and the ship's crew, Han and Dikilla. Laura was ripped in half by the two-headed shark.

Meanwhile, professor and the students explore the atoll. Assembling in an abandoned fishing village, they set out to search for scrap metal to repair the boat. Haley and Alison go swimming topless with Kirk, only to be eaten by the two-headed shark. The rest of the group meet up and find two small speedboats before an earthquake hits, causing Professor Babish to badly injure his leg. Dana bandages Babish's leg, while Jeff and Mike accompany him back to the Sea King on the dinghy. On the way back, Jeff and Mike discover Laura's severed hand in the water. They are attacked by the shark and eaten attempting to swim back to the Sea King.

The students find two boats on the island, which Kate and Paul manage to fix. Cole finds a gasoline tank to fuel them, but steals one of the boats together with Ryan, Jamie and Alex. Kate, Paul and Dana follow in the other boat. They are all unaware of the shark, which attacks Cole's boat. Ryan falls into the water and is eaten, alerting the others to the shark's presence. Paul concludes it is drawn to Cole's boat as it has a bigger engine. Cole bails, and the shark eats Jamie and Alex. When the survivors reach shore, Kate furiously confronts Cole for abandoning Jamie and Alex. A few minutes later, the Sea King is abandoned and the survivors meet on the island.

Shortly afterward, another earthquake hits. The group realizes that the earthquakes are actually the atoll collapsing in on itself. They hook up a generator to metal poles and place them in the water to distract the shark while Kate and Cole travel to the Sea King and repair the hull. The plan works until the shark attacks the poles, knocking Han and Dikilla into the water to their deaths. Kate fixes the ship, only for Cole to drive away without her, forcing her to swim back to the atoll. The two-headed shark attacks the Sea King, causing it to sink and send out a distress signal; Cole is eaten trying to escape on a lifeboat when his cellphone alerts the shark. The atoll is sinking too, prompting everyone to flee for their lives.

Dana and Kristen get separated from the group and are quickly devoured. Professor Babish and Anne also get separated from the group, and after running into a dead-end due to a tsunami suddenly approaching the atoll, they share one final kiss as the shark eats them. The rest of the group end up in the water as the small tsunami strikes the island. The remaining students swim into the half-sunk village chapel to hide, but the shark breaks in. Lyndsey uses a gun to shoot it, but it quickly eats her. Ethan uses the giant wooden cross in the chapel to try attacking it, which also fails as it eats Liza and Michelle. Paul, Kate, and Kirsten climb out the window and escape while Ethan distracts the shark, only to get caught and eaten as well.

The final three discover a gasoline tank, and lure the shark towards it, but they fail to ignite it. Kate attempts to stab the shark and is nearly eaten, but Dana Brooke sacrifices herself instead to blow up the shark. However, only one of the shark's heads get blown off. Kate and Paul find one of the boats and turn it on as a decoy, taking shelter on part of the remaining atoll still above water. The shark attacks the unmanned boat, biting the motor; it explodes, finally killing the shark. A helicopter arrives, summoned by the distress signal sent out from the sunken Sea King, saving Kate and Paul.

Cast
 Carmen Electra as Dr. Anne Babish
 Charlie O'Connell as Professor Franklin Babish
 Brooke Hogan as Kate
 David Gallegos as Paul
 Christina Bach Norman as Dana
 Geoff Ward as Cole
 Mercedes C. Young as Liza
 Shannan Stewart as Lyndsey
 Tihirah Taliaferro as Michelle
 Michael Dicarluccio as Ethan
 Corinne Nobili as Kirsten
 Ashley Bissing as Kristen
 Lauren Vera as Jamie
 Marckenson Charles as Ryan
 Benjamin James as Alex
 Chase Conner as Kirk
 Anna Jackson as Haley
 Amber English as Alison
 Collin Carmouze as Jeff
 Casey King Leslie as Mike
 Morgan Thompson as Laura
 Gerald Webb as Han
 Anthony E. Valentin as Dikila
 Alexa Score as Wakeboarder #1
 Tiffany Score as Wakeboarder #2
 Alexandre Giraudon as Michel Michel
 Joseph Velez as Man #1
 Curtis Belz as Man #2

Production
The design for the 2-headed shark was detailed in the Monster Man episode "Seeing Double". The original design of the shark had one shark head stacked on top of the other. However, creature designer Cleve Hall pushed to change the design to side-by-side heads.

Release
The film saw release on DVD with special features including a gag reel in 2012  and on Blu-ray including a "Making of" special feature.

Soundtrack
The film features "More" and "Swallow Whole" by Neon Line. "It's Killing Me to Live" by Matthew Arner. "Jungle Jam" by Yoshi Miyamoto. As well as "Transmission" by Closer to Venus.

Reception
Bloody Disgusting published a review of the film in 2017, arguing that the film attempts to develop some of the extensive list of characters and puts "makes an effort to give them all unique personalities and character traits, even if there simply isn't enough time devoted to developing them". The review commends the film for also delivering on the titular "2-headed shark attack", but argues that "the over-the-top massacres are good fun at first, but do get stale after a while" and that the film could have benefitted from cutting some characters and making the remaining death scenes more creative.

Sequels
A sequel, 3-Headed Shark Attack, was produced in 2015 by The Asylum and directed by Christopher Ray. The film features Jaason Simmons, Danny Trejo, and wrestler Rob Van Dam in leading roles. The plot revolves around marine biology students encountering a three-headed shark.

Two more films in the series premiered on Syfy, 5-Headed Shark Attack on July 30, 2017 and 6-Headed Shark Attack on August 18, 2018.

References

External links
 2 Headed Shark Attack at The Asylum
 
  2-Headed Shark Attack on Nanarland

2012 direct-to-video films
2012 horror films
2010s action horror films
2012 independent films
2012 films
2010s monster movies
American direct-to-video films
American monster movies
American action horror films
American natural horror films
2010s English-language films
Direct-to-video horror films
Films directed by Christopher Ray
Films about sharks
Films shot in Florida
Films shot in Los Angeles
American horror television films
The Asylum films
Films about shark attacks
Shark attacks in fiction
Syfy original films
2010s American films